Mesnil-sur-l'Estrée is a commune in the Eure department in Normandy in northern France.

It is one of many villages in the north of France bearing the name Estrées. The etymology of the name is from strata (cognate of English "street") which developed into "estrée" - the word for the stone-layered Roman roads in the area (some of which turned into modern highways). Hence "Mesnil-sur-l'Estrée", "Mesnil On The Road".

Population

See also
Communes of the Eure department

References

Communes of Eure